Sir William Verner, 1st Baronet, KCH (25 October 1782 – 20 January 1871), was a British soldier who served in the Napoleonic wars, was wounded at the Battle of Waterloo and resigned as a colonel. He served as a politician, including 36 years as a Member of Parliament. Two of his sons were also members of Parliament. Verner was made Knight Commander of the Hanoverian Order and a Baronet, and was Grand Master of Armagh and Orange Order of Ireland.

Early life
William Verner was the son of Colonel James Verner, a Member of Parliament, and Jane Clarke. As a boy, he studied at Woodville, which overlooked Lucan, Dublin. He had the opportunity to attend Trinity College, Dublin, but preferred a career in the army.

Military
Verner's interest in an army career began when he commanded the Churchill Yeomanry. At first, he was a staff officer under the Lord Lieutenant of Dublin in the 7th Queen's Own Hussars. He fought in the Peninsular War of the Napoleonic Wars at the Battle of Corunna under Sir John Moore in 1808–1809. He also fought at the Battle of the Pyrenees under the Duke of Wellington, in 1814 at the Battle of Orthes and the Battle of Toulouse, and in 1815 the Battle of Waterloo, rising to the rank of lieutenant-colonel in the 7th Queen's Own Hussars, under Lord Henry Paget, 1st Marquess of Anglesey. Verner was wounded by a musket shot to the head at Waterloo and retired from the army with the rank of colonel.

Public service
William held three positions as High Sheriff: first for County Monaghan in 1820, County Armagh in 1821 and last for County Tyrone in 1823. He was also a Justice of the Peace and Deputy Lieutenant of Tyrone. He was a member of the Conservative party and a Member of Parliament for County Armagh between 1832 and 1868.

A supporter of the Protestant Orange Order, he was once struck off the Commission of the Peace by Lord Normanby for toasting the Battle of the Diamond at a public dinner in Ireland.

Personal life

Marriage and family
He married Harriet Wingfield, daughter of colonel the Hon. Edward Wingfield, younger son of The 3rd Viscount Powerscourt and Harriet Esther Westenra, on 19 October 1819. The couple had 2 sons and 8 daughters, at least 2 of which died in infancy. The children were buried at Powerscourt. He seemed to have good relationships with his children, who called their father "Taffy". They were:

Sir William Verner, 2nd Baronet (4 Apr 1822 - 10 Jan 1873) became Member of Parliament for the County Armagh
Sir Edward Wingfield Verner, 4th Baronet (1 Oct 1830 - 21 Jun 1899) 1863 an MP for Lisburn and after his older brother's death, became MP for County Armagh, a position he held until 1880 when he resigned.
Emily Verner (d. 13 June 1911) married Rev. Hon. Francis Nathanial Clements, son of Nathaniel Clements, 2nd Earl of Leitrim. They had no children.
Frederica Verner (d. 1909). She married Maj. Henry Guise, son of Sir John Wright Guise, 3rd Baronet. They had two sons.
Constantia Henrietta Frances Verner (d. 7 Dec 1923). She married William Sandford Pakenham, son of the Very Rev. Hon. Henry Pakenham and Eliza Catherine Sandford. They had six sons and a daughter.
Amelia
Cecelia
Frances Elizabeth
Harriet Jane Isabella

Real estate

Churchill
Following the Battle of Waterloo, and seeing his father in failing health, he took over the running of the family estate, named Churchill, which included the house, a church with a bell inscribed to the Virgin Mary, and graveyard. In 1788, he received the estates following the death of Thomas Verner, Esquire, his paternal great uncle. In addition to Churchill in Armagh, Thomas Verner also had estates in Meath, Monaghan and Tyrone. Since William was only 5 years old in 1788, his parents James and Jane moved into the home with their family and were guardians of the residence until 1807.

During the Great Famine of Ireland (1845–1852), Verner offered work to any of his tenants in need and reduced rents by as much as half.

Inismagh
Verner also had property at Annahoe in County Tyrone, Ireland.

Eaton Square
Verner met his wife in London and after they were married they bought a home there at 86 Eaton Square. Harriet also visited her parents often at Corke Abbey.

Death
Verner had good health until 1870 when he began to decline. He died on 20 January 1871 at his home at Eaton Square. His body was sent to Loughgall, County Armagh, in Ulster for his funeral and burial. The procession was 2 miles long and was estimated to have included 10,000 people.

Honours and arms
In 1837, he was also made Knight Commander of the Hanoverian Order by Sir Robert Peel or William IV. On 22 July 1846, Verner was created a baronet, of Verner's Bridge in the County of County Armagh. He was a Grand Master for Armagh and a Deputy Grand Master of the Orange Order for Ireland.

See also
 Verner baronets
 Vernersbridge railway station

Notes

References

Further reading
 
 
 

1782 births
1871 deaths
7th Queen's Own Hussars officers
Baronets in the Baronetage of the United Kingdom
Members of the Parliament of the United Kingdom for County Armagh constituencies (1801–1922)
UK MPs 1832–1835
UK MPs 1835–1837
UK MPs 1837–1841
UK MPs 1841–1847
UK MPs 1847–1852
UK MPs 1852–1857
UK MPs 1857–1859
UK MPs 1859–1865
UK MPs 1865–1868